OCFA may refer to:
 Odd-chain fatty acid
 Orange County Fire Authority
 Open Computer Forensics Architecture